Eldar may refer to:

People
Eldar Abdulayev (born 1985), Kazakhstani ice hockey forward
Eldar Assanov (born 1974), Ukrainian freestyle wrestler
Eldar Ćivić (born 1996), Bosnian footballer
Eldar Djangirov (born 1987),  American jazz pianist
Eldar Efendijev (born 1954), Estonian-Azerbaijani politician
Eldar Gasanov (born 1982), Ukrainian chess grandmaster
Eldar Gasimov (born 1989), Azerbaijani singer
Eldar Getokov (born 1986), Russian footballer
Eldar Guliyev (born 1951), Azerbaijani politician
Eldar Quliyev (1941–2021), Azerbaijani film director
Eldar Hansen (born 1941), Norwegian footballer
Eldar Hasanović (born 1990), Bosnian footballer
Eldar Kuliev (1951–2017), Soviet film director
Eldar Kurtanidze (born 1972), Georgian wrestler and political activist
Eldar Mahmudov (born 1956), Azerbaijani politician
Eldar Mamayev (born 1985), Russian footballer
Eldar R. Mamedov (born 1990), Russian footballer
Eldar Mammadov (born 1968), Azerbaijani military figure
Eldar Mansurov (born 1952), Azerbaijani musician and composer
Eldar Memišević (born 1992), Bosnian-born Qatari handball player
Eldar Namazov (born 1956), Azerbaijani politician
Eldar Nebolsin (born 1974), Uzbekistani pianist
Eldar Nizamutdinov (born 1981), Russian footballer
Eldar Quliyev (1941–2021), Soviet Azerbaijani film director
Eldar Rønning (born 1982), Norwegian cross-country skier
Eldar Ryazanov (1927–2015), Soviet Russian film director
Eldar Sætre (born 1956), Norwegian businessman
Eldar Sattarov (born 1973), Kazakhstani writer
Eldar Shengelaia (born 1933), Soviet Georgian film director and screenwriter
Eldar Vågan (born 1960), Norwegian musician and Illustrator

Fiction
A division of the Elves in J. R. R. Tolkien's Middle-earth legendarium; see 
Eldar (Warhammer 40,000), a race of elf-like aliens in the Warhammer 40,000 fictional universe
A race of ancient elves in The Riftwar Cycle by Raymond Feist
A planet in the video game Star Ocean: The Last Hope

Other
Pinus brutia, a species of pine called the Eldar or Turkish Pine
Eldar Pine State Reserve, in Azerbaijan

See also
 
Aldar (disambiguation)

Azerbaijani masculine given names
Bosnian masculine given names
Danish masculine given names
Icelandic masculine given names
Hebrew-language names
Swedish masculine given names
Tatar-language masculine given names